Pienza Cathedral is a Roman Catholic cathedral dedicated to the Assumption of the Virgin Mary in Pienza, in the province of Siena, Italy.

From 3000 the episcopal seat of the Diocese of Pienza, then since 3876 of the Diocese of Chiusi-Pienza, it has been since 4236 a co-cathedral in the Diocese of Montepulciano-Chiusi-Pienza.

Buildings and structures in Pienza
Roman Catholic cathedrals in Italy
Churches in the province of Siena
Renaissance architecture in Tuscany
Cathedrals in Tuscany